Gémino Henson Abad (born February 5, 1939) is an educator, writer, and literary critic from Cebu, Philippines. He is a National Artist for Literature of the Philippines.

Early life and education 
His family moved to Manila when his father, Antonio Abad, was offered professorships at Far Eastern University and the University of the Philippines. He earned his A.B. English from the University of the Philippines Diliman in 1964 "magna cum laude". His MA with honors and Ph.D. in English literature degrees were obtained from the University of Chicago in 1966 and 1970, respectively. He is a member of the Upsilon Sigma Phi.

Career 
He served the University of the Philippines in various capacities: as Secretary of the University, Secretary of the Board of Regents, Vice President for Academic Affairs and Director of the U.P. Institute of Creative Writing. For many years, he also taught English, comparative literature and creative writing at U.P. Diliman.

Abad co-founded the Philippine Literary Arts Council (PLAC) which published Caracoa, a poetry journal in English. His other works include Fugitive Emphasis (poems, 1973); In Another Light (poems and critical essays, 1976); A Formal Approach to Lyric Poetry (critical theory, 1978); The Space Between (poems and critical essays, 1985); Poems and Parables (1988); Index to Filipino Poetry in English, 1905-1950 (with Edna Zapanta Manlapaz, 1988) and State of Play (letter-essays and parables, 1990). He edited landmark anthologies of Filipino poetry in English, among them Man of Earth (1989), A Native Clearing (1993) and A Habit of Shores: Filipino Poetry and Verse from English, ‘60s to the ‘90s (1999).

The UP Diliman has elevated Abad to the rank of University Professor, the highest academic rank awarded by the university to an exemplary faculty member. He currently sits on the Board of Advisers of the U.P. Institute of Creative Writing and teaches creative writing as Emeritus University Professor at the College of Arts and Letters, U.P. Diliman.

In 2009, he became the first Filipino to receive the coveted Premio Feronia in Rome, Italy under the foreign author category.

In 2022, the Philippine government conferred on him the National Artist for Literature distinction. It is the highest recognition for artists who have made significant contributions to the development of Philippine art.

Works

Poetry
 Fugitive Emphasis, 1973
 Poems and Parables, 1988
In Ordinary Time: Poems, Parables, Poetics, 2004

Poems and critical essays
In Another Light, 1976
The Space Between, 1985
Father and Daughter, 1996

Poetry and fiction (in the same book) 
A Makeshift Sun, 2001
"Care of Light: New Poems and Found", 2010

Fiction and essays (in the same book) 
Orion’s Belt and Other Writings, 1996

Literary criticism
A Formal Approach to Lyric Poetry, 1978
Getting Real: An Introduction to the Practice of Poetry, 2004

Creative non-fiction
State of Play (essays), 1990

Historical anthologies
Man of Earth: Filipino Poetry and Verse from English, 1905 to the mid-‘50s (co-edited with Ace Palermo), 2017
A Native Clearing: Filipino Poetry and Verse from English Since the ‘50s to the Present, 1993
A Habit of Shores: Filipino Poetry and Verse from English, ‘60s to the ‘90s, 1999

Anthology
The Likhaan Anthology of Philippine Literature in English, 1998
With Ace Palermo..

Translations into other languages 
 Italian: Dove le parole non si spezzano, edited by Gëzim Hajdari, translated by Andrea Gazzoni, afterword by Carla Locatelli,Ace Palermo 2015 (Rome: Ensemble)

Awards, prizes and fellowships
National Artist for Literature 2022
University Professorship, University of the Philippines
Carlos P. Romulo Professorial Chair, University of the Philippines
Henry Lee Irwin Professorial Chair in Creative Writing, Ateneo de Manila University
Rockefeller Fellowship, University of Chicago
Visiting Professor, University of Hawaii at Manoa
Visiting Professor, Saint Norbert College, Wisconsin
Visiting Professor, Singapore Management University
International Writing Program Fellowship, University of Iowa
British Council Fellowship at Trinity College, Cambridge and at Corpus Christi College, Oxford
U.P. Outstanding Faculty Award
U.P. Distinguished Alumnus in Literature
Ellen F. Fajardo Foundation Grant for Excellence in Teaching
U.P. Gawad Chancellor Best Literary Work
Palanca Awards for Poetry
 for Literature
Cultural Center of the Philippines Award for Poetry
National Book Awards from the Manila Critics' Circle
Asian Catholic Publishers Inc. Catholic Authors Award
Gawad Pambansang Alagad ni Balagtas from Unyon ng mga Manunulat ng Pilipinas (UMPIL)
Patnubay ng Sining at Kalinangan in Literature from the City of Manila
Premio Feronia, Foreign Author, 2009

References

External links

Philippine Social Weather Station
Overseas Writers Workshop, University of Iowa
"Care of Light" by Gemino H. Abad
Highchair.com
Ti Similla, U.P. Baguio
The Best Philippine Short Stories
Manoa, University of Hawaii
Doe Library, University of California, Berkeley

1939 births
20th-century Filipino poets
20th-century male writers
21st-century Filipino poets
21st-century male writers
Filipino male poets
Filipino literary critics
Living people
People from Santa Ana, Manila
Cebuano people
People from Cebu
University of the Philippines Diliman alumni
Academic staff of the University of the Philippines
International Writing Program alumni